The Anthomyiidae are a large and diverse family of Muscoidea flies. Most look rather like small houseflies, but are commonly drab grey. The genus Anthomyia, in contrast, is generally conspicuously patterned in black-and-white or black-and-silvery-grey. Most are difficult to identify, apart from a few groups such as the kelp flies that are conspicuous on beaches.

The name Anthomyiidae was derived from Greek anthos (flower) plus myia (a fly).

Some species are commonly called "root-maggots", as the larvae are found in the stems and roots of various plants. As larvae, some also feed on decaying plant material. The well-known grey "seaweed flies" or "kelp flies" (Fucellia) are examples. Others are scavengers in such places as birds' nests; yet other species are leaf miners; the family also includes inquilines, commensals, and parasitic larvae.

Some species in the family are significant agricultural pests, particularly some from the genus Delia, which includes the onion fly (D. antiqua), the wheat bulb fly (D. coarctata), the turnip root fly (D. floralis), the bean seed fly (D. platura), and the cabbage root fly (D. radicum).

In some contexts, like mountain environments, the adults can be common flower visitors, also being involved in pollination.

Description
For terms see Morphology of Diptera
These flies are small or moderate in size. Hypopleural bristles found on the sides of the thorax are apical. The anal vein of the wing reaches the margin of the wings (except in Chelisia). The median vein is straight, not curved towards the anterior alar margin. Three pairs of postsutural dorsocentral bristles almost always are present. The first segment of the posterior tarsi are on the lower side near the base with minute bristles. The sternopleuron lower side often has short, soft hairs. Eyes in the male in most cases are close-set or contiguous. Females of many species are not known as of yet.

Classification
 Family Anthomyiidae -- anthomyiid flies
Subfamily Anthomyiinae
Tribe Anthomyiini

Genus Anthomyia Meigen, 1803
Genus Botanophila Lioy, 1864
Genus Chiastocheta Pokorny, 1889
Genus Fucellia Robineau-Desvoidy, 1842
Genus Hylemya Robineau-Desvoidy, 1830
Genus Hylemyza Schnabl & Dziedzicki, 1911
Tribe Chirosiini
Genus Chirosia Rondani, 1856
Genus Egle Robineau-Desvoidy, 1830
Genus Lasiomma Stein, 1916
Genus Strobilomyia Michelsen, 1988
Tribe Hydrophoriini
Genus Acridomyia Stackelberg, 1929
Genus Adia  Robineau-Desvoidy, 1830
Genus Boreophorbia Michelsen, 1987
Genus Coenosopsia Malloch, 1924
Genus Delia Robineau-Desvoidy, 1830
Genus Eustalomyia Kowarz, 1873
Genus Heterostylodes Hennig, 1967
Genus Hydrophoria Robineau-Desvoidy, 1830
Genus Leucophora Robineau-Desvoidy, 1830
Genus Paregle Schnabl, 1911
Genus Phorbia Robineau-Desvoidy, 1830
Genus Subhylemyia Ringdahl, 1933
Genus Zaphne Robineau-Desvoidy, 1830
Subfamily Pegomyinae
Tribe Pegomyini
Genus Alliopsis Schnabl & Dziedzicki, 1911
Genus Emmesomyia Malloch, 1917
Genus Eutrichota Kowarz, 1893
Genus Mycophaga Rondani, 1856
Genus Paradelia Ringdahl, 1933
Genus Parapegomyia Griffiths, 1984
Genus Pegomya Robineau-Desvoidy, 1830
Tribe Myopinini
Genus Pegoplata Schnabl & Dziedzicki, 1911
Genus Calythea Schnabl in Schnabl & Dziedzicki, 1911
Genus Myopina Robineau-Desvoidy, 1830

See also
 Pest Information Wiki

References

Further reading
 Genera - Suwa, M., & B. Darvas, 1998. Family Anthomyiidae. In: Contributions to a manual of Palaearctic Diptera Volume 3 (L. Papp & B. Darvas, eds.): 571–616. Science Herald, Budapest.
 Species - Hennig, W., 1966–1976. 63a. Anthomyiidae. In: Die Fliegen der paläarktischen Region 7(1) (Erwin Lindner, ed.): 1–974, pl. 1-78. E. Schweizerbart, Stuttgart.

Identification
 Ackland, D. M. 2001. Revision of afrotropical Anthomyia Meigen, 1803 (Diptera: Anthomyiidae), with descriptions of ten new species. African Invertebrates 42: 1-94. 
 Ackland, D. M. 2008. Revision of Afrotropical Delia Robineau-Desvoidy, 1830 (Diptera: Anthomyiidae), with descriptions of six new species. African Invertebrates 49 (1): 1-75. 
 K. Yu. Elberg Family Anthomyiidae in Bei-Bienko, G. Ya, 1988 Keys to the insects of the European Part of the USSR Volume 5 (Diptera) Part 2 English edition
 Emden, F. I. Van (1941): Keys to the Muscidae of the Ethiopian Region :Scatophaginae, Anthomyiinae, Lispinae, Fanniinae. Bull. Ent.Res., 1941–1942, 32: 251–275. Keys to Afrotropical genera and species. See Pont & Ackland in Crosskey, R. W. et al. 1980 for updated classification and nomenclature.
 Hennig, W., 1966–1976. 63a. Anthomyiidae. In: Die Fliegen der paläarktischen Region 7(1) (Erwin Lindner, ed.): 1–974, pl. 1-78. E. Schweizerbart, Stuttgart. Monograph of Palaearctic species.
 Hucket, H. C. (1965): The Muscidae of Northern Canada, Alaska and Greenland (Diptera). Mem. Ent. Soc. Canada, 42: 1–369. Keys, illustrations.
 Huckett H. C. (1971): The Anthomyiidae of California exclusive of. the subfamily Scatophaginae (Diptera). Bull. Calif. Insect Survey. 12: 1–121.  Illustrated Keys. South Nearctic and North Neotropical.
 Pont, A.C., 1972, Family Muscidae. In: A Catalogue of the Diptera of the Americas South of the United States, 97, 111 p. Museu de Zoologia, Universidade de São Paulo, São Paulo.
 Suwa, M. (1974): Anthomyiidae of Japan (Diptera). Insecta Matsumurana New Series 4 : 1–247. Comprehensive revision. Excellent illustrations.
 Suwa, M., & B. Darvas (1998): Family Anthomyiidae. In: Contributions to a manual of Palaearctic Diptera Volume 3 (L. Papp & B. Darvas, eds.): 571–616. Science Herald, Budapest.

Species lists
  Palaearctic
 Nearctic
  Australasian/Oceanian
 Japan

External links

 Family description and image
 Family ANTHOMYIIDAE at the Hawaii Biological Survey
 Leafmines of Anthomyiidae
 Anthomyiid Pack
 Diptera.info Gallery
 Anthomyiidae at Bug Guide
 Family Anthomyiidae at EOL images
 Morphology of important Central Europe species pdf

 
Insect vectors of plant pathogens
Brachycera families
Articles containing video clips